Galt Joint Union High School District (GJUHSD) is a high school district headquartered in Galt, California.

It serves sections of Sacramento and San Joaquin counties.

In Sacramento County it serves Galt, Clay, Herald, and a small section of Wilton. Areas it serves in San Joaquin county include Collierville, Thornton and a section of Dogtown.

Feeder school districts include Oak View Elementary School District, and the New Hope School District.

Schools
Zoned:
Galt High School
Liberty Ranch High School

Others:
Estrellita High School
Galt Adult School

References

External links
 
School districts in Sacramento County, California
School districts in San Joaquin County, California